Self Medicated is a 2005 independent film based on real-life events from writer/director/lead actor Monty Lapica about Andrew, a troubled teenager whose mother has him kidnapped at age 17 by a private company and forcibly committed to a locked-down psychiatric institute. Monty Lapica was not originally cast for acting in the film, according to the subsequent documentary, The Making of Self-Medicated (2007), the first-time writer and director was also slated to play the starring role in his own life story after casting-calls failed to produce a suitable candidate.

Plot
On the edges of Las Vegas, 17-year-old Andrew's life is spiraling out of control. Unable to cope with the loss of his father, Andrew's descent into drugs and violence is gaining momentum, and the once promising young man is now headed for self-destruction.
 
Andrew's mother, helpless to control her son and fighting an addiction of her own, refuses to watch idly as her only child destroys himself. As a last resort, she hires a private company to forcibly kidnap and confine him in a locked-down and corrupt psychiatric hospital. As Andrew is subjected to the secret physical and emotional abuses of the program something inside him is re-awakened. He must somehow get free to save what's left of his life, but to do that, he knows he must first face his own demons head-on.

Cast 
 Monty Lapica as Andrew Eriksen
 Diane Venora as Louise Eriksen
 Michael Bowen as Dan Jones
 Greg Germann as Keith McCauley

Reception
On review aggregator Rotten Tomatoes, Self-Medicated has a score of 37% based on 38 reviews. The critics’ consensus reads, "Self-Medicated features some nice performances, but is too sentimental and unfocused to be a truly compelling film."

The Hollywood Reporter said there was "a raw, unmannered intensity in Lapica's performance sets the requisite tone for the entire production. Self- Medicated is just what the doctor ordered.", and Variety said the film was "a searing portrait of an out-of-control youth . . . strong acting from all quarters and an especially blistering performance from Lapica.  Packs a startling punch!"

After complimenting the musical score by Anthony Marinelli and cinematography by Denis Maloney, Jeannette Catsoulis writes for The New York Times, "When the institutional 'abuses' promised in the press notes fail to materialize (unless you count enforced standing and essay writing), the story becomes a monotonous loop of escape and recapture."

Release 
The film was theatrically released on August 31, 2007 in 15 markets, including New York City, Los Angeles, Dallas, Houston, Boston, San Diego, Chicago, San Francisco, Denver, Portland, Seattle, Indianapolis, Phoenix, Austin, and Las Vegas.

Awards 
The film has toured the festival circuit extensively, collecting 39 awards.

 Rome Independent Film Festival – Grand Jury Prize — 2006
 Australian International Film Festival – Best Feature Film & Best Actress (Diane Venora)
 Angel Award — Best Motion Picture — 2007
 PRISM Award Winner — 2006
 WorldFest International Film Festival – Gold Remi Award — 2006
 Phoenix Film Festival – Sundance Channel Audience Award & Best Ensemble (Cast) — 2006
 Berkeley Film Festival – Grand Festival Award — 2006
 Memphis International Film Festival – Jury Award — 2006
 Tahoe/Reno International Film Festival – Best Spotlight Feature (Festival Prize) — 2005
 Newport Beach International Film Festival – Best First Feature (Breakthrough Award) — 2006
 San Luis Obispo International Film Festival – Best Feature — 2006
 Zion International Film Festival – Grand Jury Prize
 Santa Fe Film Festival – Best of the Southwest — 2005
 Tiburon International Film Festival – Best Actor (Monty Lapica) — 2006
 DIY Film Festival – Best Feature & Best Director — 2006
 George Lindsey UNA Film Festival – Professional Feature (Monty Lapica and Tommy Bell) — 2006
 Cosmos International Film Festival – Best Feature
 Flint International Film Festival – Competition Jury Prize
 Twin Rivers Film Festival – Feature Film Award
 Zoie Film Festival – Best Feature Film — 2006
 Big Island Film Festival – Best Feature & Up-And-Coming Filmmaker Award — 2006
 Santa Clarita Film Festival – Best Feature & Fuji Best Feature Shot on Film — 2006
 Lake Arrowhead Film Festival – Best Feature — 2006
 Trenton International Film Festival – Best Screenplay — 2006
 BridgeFest Film Festival Canada – Best Feature
 Staten Island Film Festival – Best New Filmmaker
 Estes Park Film Festival – Best Feature & Audience Award
  Tony Bennett / Mike Agassi Foundation – Inspiration Award
 New York VisionFest – Best Feature & Best Actor (Monty Lapica) & Best Editing — 2006
 Charlotte Film Festival – Audience Award — 2006

See also 
 Teen escort company
 World Wide Association of Specialty Programs and Schools

References

External links 
 
 
 

2005 films
2005 drama films
American independent films
2005 independent films
Films scored by Anthony Marinelli
2000s English-language films
2000s American films
Films about juvenile delinquency
Teen drama films